Nikola Rnić (born 11 January 1984) is a Serbian football midfielder who plays for Ekonomac in Prva Futsal Liga.

Career
From 2002 to 2007 he played for BSK Batajnica, Radnički Nova Pazova, Dunav Stari Banovci, Hajduk Lion, BASK and Zemun. 
Then he played with Ekonomac Kragujevac in Prva Futsal Liga for season and half. 
After that, he returned in football and played for Čukarički on 21 Jelen SuperLiga, and later for Srem Jakovo, Banat Zrenjanin and Zemun. In 2013, he moved in Radnik Surdulica.

In 2015, he returned in Futsal and play for Ekonomac.

References

External links
 
 Nikola Rnić stats at utakmica.rs

1984 births
Living people
People from Zemun
Footballers from Belgrade
Association football midfielders
Serbian footballers
FK Radnički Nova Pazova players
FK Hajduk Beograd players
FK BASK players
FK Zemun players
FK Čukarički players
FK Srem Jakovo players
FK Banat Zrenjanin players
FK Radnik Surdulica players
FK Inđija players
Serbian SuperLiga players
Serbian men's futsal players